Yuliya Sergeevna Petrova (born May 24, 1979 in Chelyabinsk) is a Russian water polo player, who won the bronze medal at the 2000 Summer Olympics. She was named Most Valuable Player at the 2000 Women's Water Polo Olympic Qualifier in Palermo, Italy, where the Women's National Team qualified for the Sydney Olympics.

See also
 List of Olympic medalists in water polo (women)

External links
 

1979 births
Living people
Russian female water polo players
Olympic water polo players of Russia
Water polo players at the 2000 Summer Olympics
Olympic bronze medalists for Russia
Olympic medalists in water polo
Medalists at the 2000 Summer Olympics
21st-century Russian women